Angelides is a surname. Notable people with the surname include:

 Brendan Angelides, American electronic music producer and composer
 Chloe Angelides (born 1992), American singer-songwriter
 Phil Angelides (born 1953), American politician

See also
 Angelidis